These are the international rankings of Estonia

International rankings

References

Estonia